Greece and Ellinikí Radiofonía Tileórasi (ERT) chose to host a national selection with the winner being chosen an "expert" jury. Mariana Efstratiou was chosen with "To diko sou asteri" and placed 9th at Eurovision.

Before Eurovision

National final 
The national final took place on 31 March 1989 at the ERT TV Studios in Athens and was hosted by Dafni Bokota. The songs were presented as video clips and the winning song was chosen by a panel of "experts".

It was later revealed that Mando was supposed to win the national selection; she was second, only one point behind Marianna. Mando took action against the Greek television station ERT because one of the jury members didn't vote. She won the ruling, but since the process was too late to reverse the decision, Marianna went to Eurovision.

At Eurovision
"To diko sou asteri" was performed 19th on the night (following Switzerland's Furbaz with "Viver senza tei" and preceding Iceland's Daníel Ágúst with "Það sem enginn ser"). At the close of voting, it had received 56 points, placing 9th in a field of 22.

It was succeeded as the Greek representative at the 1990 Contest by Christos Callow & Wave with "Horis skopo".

Voting

References 

1989
Countries in the Eurovision Song Contest 1989
Eurovision